Ron Glick (born January 23, 1985, in Branford, Connecticut) is a former Israeli professional football (soccer) .

Playing career 
Glick made his senior debut in a Toto Cup match during the 2004/05 season. The next season, he made his Israeli Premier League debut against Beitar Jerusalem as a substitute in the ninetieth minute. Four rounds later, Glick found himself in the starting eleven against F.C. Ashdod. The 2006/07 season was due to be his breakout year, but a rash of injuries relegated him to seeing most matches from the stands.

After returning from injury, Glick hired a personal trainer to stay return to match fitness. He also had an unsuccessful trial with Toronto FC in the American MLS, later San Jose Earthquakes and Columbus Crew in May 2008. In May 2009, Glick moved to Australian club FC Oont, on a free transfer. He has subsequently been named captain and helped the team to a runners up finish for the 2010 season, scoring a few key goals in the process.

National Team
On February 9, 2004, Glick made his debut with the Israeli under-19 squad against their counterparts from Romania. The two-game series, one match in Kiryat Ata, the other in Ra'anana, were the only appearances that Glick has made for a national side at any age level.

Personal life 
In September 2009, Glick heroically rescued a person drowning in the Mediterranean Sea. Glick was on the beach in Herzliya when he heard someone screaming for help. No lifeguards were present so Glick grabbed a surfboard and was able to save the person from drowning.

Model career
Glick is also a model formerly with the Roberto Modeling Agency in Israel, he recently signed with Ford Models in the USA.

References

Footnotes

1985 births
Israeli Jews
Living people
Israeli footballers
Jewish American sportspeople
Maccabi Petah Tikva F.C. players
Hapoel Mahane Yehuda F.C. players
Maccabi Herzliya F.C. players
Israeli Premier League players
Liga Leumit players
Israeli male models
Jewish male models
American emigrants to Israel
Association football forwards
21st-century American Jews